Shun'ichirō, Shun'ichiro or Shun'ichirou (written: 俊一郎) is a masculine Japanese given name. Notable people with the name include:

 (born 1931), Japanese footballer and manager
 (born 1987), Japanese footballer

Japanese masculine given names